Major General Hadush "Hayelom" Araya (1955–1996) is a former member of the Tigrayan Peoples' Liberation Front (TPLF), which was the leading member of the Ethiopian People's Revolutionary Democratic Front (EPRDF) political coalition. While fighting as a TPLF fighter, he earned the nickname Hayelom, "Overpowering" for his brave and daring acts. 

He was born in Addi Nebreid in Northwestern Tigray, and although he completed high school in Adwa. After the Ethiopian revolution broke out, he joined the TPLF. As a commander of EPRDF forces, General Hayelom led his forces to northern Shewa and later marched to Addis Ababa coming out victorious in 1991. One of his most daring acts was the "Agazi Operation", which happened on the early evening of 5 February 1985: he led a squad of TPLF fighters in attacking the main prison in Mek'ele, and freed over a thousand prisoners, killed 16 prison guards and wounded 9 soldiers without losing a single man. He later become one of the military leaders in the defence force of the Transitional Government of Ethiopia.

General Hayelom was shot down point blank in a restaurant bar in Addis Ababa on 14 February 1996; the motives for his assassination still remain unexplained. In May 2008, the Late General Hayelom Araya Monument was unveiled at his birthplace, Shire, in the Tigray Region.

See also
 Holeta

References 

1955 births
1996 deaths
People from Tigray Region
Ethiopian generals